Television networks in Venezuela can be divided into three categories:
 National broadcasting networks, such as Venevision
 Regional broadcasting networks, such as Televisora Regional del Táchira
 Community broadcasting networks, such as Catia TVe

Table of broadcast networks
All of the networks listed below operate a number of terrestrial television stations. In addition, several of these networks are also aired on cable and satellite services.

History

Defunct over-the-air Venezuelan television networks
 Televisora Nacional - Government network, predecessor of Vale TV.
 Televisa - The first commercial network in Venezuela, was bought out by the Grupo Cisneros and became Venevisión.
 RCTV (Radio Caracas Televisión) - Second commercial network whose license expired on May 27, 2007. The license renewal was refused by the Government of Hugo Chávez. It was re-launched on cable and satellite television networks on July 16, 2007 as RCTV International.
 Televisa del Zulia - First regional commercial network, created in 1956 and closed in 1960.
 Ondas del Lago Televisión - Regional television network - Active in the late '50s.
 Radio Valencia Televisión - A regional over-the-air broadcast network from 1958 to 1962.
 Teletrece - A regional television network - Active in the 60's.
 Canal 11 Televisión - Commercial television network, 1966 – 1968.
 Canal 11 (Maracaibo) - A regional television network - Active in the 60's.
 Marte TV - A Caracas regional network.  Sold and re-launched as La Tele on December 1, 2002.

See also
 Television in Venezuela
 Lists of television channels
 List of newspapers in Venezuela

Television networks
Venezuela